Mundra Thermal Power Station is located at Mundra in Kutch district in the Indian state of Gujarat. The power plant is one of the coal-based power plants of Adani Power. The coal for the power plant is imported primarily from Bunyu, Indonesia. Source of water for the power plant is sea water from the Gulf of Kutch.

It is the world's 11th-largest single location coal-based thermal power plant as well as India's second largest operational power plant after NTPC Vindhyanchal.

Capacity 
The plant has nine power generating units, unit# 5 to 9 involves super-critical boiler technology.

In July 2012 Adani Power have requested Central Electricity Regulatory Commission to increase the power tariff due to increase in price of coal imported from Indonesia.

See also

 Mundra Ultra Mega Power Project owned by Tata Power
 Mundra Port

References

Coal-fired power stations in Gujarat
Economy of Kutch district
Energy infrastructure completed in 2009
2009 establishments in Gujarat